The Pteronyssidae are a family of the Acarina (mite) order Sarcoptiformes. They contain many feather mites.

Selected genera

 Anephippius
 Cleyastobius
 Conomerus
 Dicrurobius
 Hyonyssus
 Metapteronyssus
 Micropteroherpus
 Monapsidus
 Mouchetia
 Neopteronyssus
 Parapteronyssus
 Pegopteronyssus
 Pteroherpus
 Pteronyssoides
 Pteronyssus
 Pterotrogus
 Ramphastobius
 Scutulanyssus
 Stenopteronyssus
 Timalinyssus
 Vanginyssus
 Zygepigynia

External links
 https://web.archive.org/web/20050304231640/http://insects.tamu.edu/research/collection/hallan/acari/Pteronyssidae.txt

Sarcoptiformes
Parasites of birds
Taxa named by Anthonie Cornelis Oudemans
Acari families